Albert Bertie Steede (born 17 May 1968 in Bermuda) is a Bermudian cricketer. He is a right-handed batsman. He has played 19 List A matches for Bermuda, most as part of the Red Stripe Bowl. He has played for Bermuda in four ICC Trophy tournaments, including the 2005 tournament that saw Bermuda qualify for the World Cup for the first time. He has not played for them since that tournament however.

References
Cricket Archive profile
Cricinfo profile

1968 births
Living people
Bermudian cricketers